Merrill H. Werts (November 17, 1922–September 22, 2011) was an American politician who served in the Kansas Senate as a Republican from the 22nd district from 1979 to 1989.

Werts was born in Smith Center, Kansas and raised on a farm. He attended Kansas State University, but his education there was interrupted by service in World War II; Werts entered the U.S. Army in June 1943 and fought in the European theater, losing a leg in Germany. He left the Army in March 1946 and returned to KSU, graduating in 1947. He received a master's degree in agricultural economics from Cornell University in 1948.

After completing his education, Werts worked in banking, eventually rising to become president of a bank in Junction City, Kansas. He was elected to the State Senate in 1978, taking office in 1979; in 1988, he declined to run for re-election, and Lana Oleen succeeded him in the Senate.

References

1922 births
2011 deaths
20th-century American politicians
Republican Party Kansas state senators
People from Junction City, Kansas
Kansas State University alumni
Cornell University alumni
American bank presidents